Crow Edge is a hamlet in Dunford civil parish, situated on the A616, two miles southeast of Hepworth, West Yorkshire in the metropolitan borough of Barnsley in the metropolitan county of South Yorkshire, England. Until 1974 it formed part of Penistone Rural District.

Industry
Since about 1857 Crow Edge has been home to the Hepworth Iron Company's coal mines, fire clay pits and clay products works, later Hepworth Building Products Ltd.'s pipe works. From 2005 this has been part of the Dutch Wavin Group. In 2013, 50 acres of their site was sold to the British company R. Plevin and Sons Ltd. Thereby making the site, the largest waste wood recycling facility in the United Kingdom.

Rail
From 1850–1950 Hazlehead Bridge railway station, on the Sheffield, Ashton-under-Lyne and Manchester Railway's Woodhead Line, provided a rail link for passenger traffic to Crow Edge and onward by bus service to Huddersfield. From 1850–1964 there was goods traffic on the line and a branch line to the Crow Edge works.

References

External links

Hepworth Iron Co. Ltd. at Durham Mining Museum
Hepworth Iron Co at Grace's Guide

Hamlets in South Yorkshire
Towns and villages of the Peak District
Geography of the Metropolitan Borough of Barnsley